The fourth season of  German television series Alarm für Cobra 11 – Die Autobahnpolizei aired between October 1, 1998, and May 6, 1999. It follows a two-man team of Autobahnpolizei (highway police) in the area of Berlin.

Cast
 Mark Keller as André Fux
 Erdoğan Atalay as Semir Gerkhan

Mark Keller departed the cast after the season finale.

Episodes

1998 German television seasons
1999 German television seasons